First Fits is the debut album by alternative rock band FITTED, featuring Mike Watt (The Minutemen, fIREHOSE), Graham Lewis (Wire), Matthew Simms (Wire), Bob Lee (The Black Gang).

Production and release
The album was recorded from 2017 to 2018 with Lewis and Watt trading lead vocals. The first single was "Training Pit Bulls For The Navy."

The first two singles, "Training Pitbulls for the Navy" and "The Legend of Lydmar Lucia", preceded the release of the full album.

Track listing
Plug In The Jug
Training Pit Bulls For The Navy
The Legend Of Lydmar Lucia
Magically Blessed
The Chunk That Got Chewed
The First Fit

Musical Personnel
Mike Watt - bass, vocals
Graham Lewis - bass, synth, vocals
Matthew Simms - guitar, modular synth, electric organ
Bob Lee - drums

Reception
Kevin Quinn of Music-News.com gave the album five stars. James Bennett of SLUG Magazine praised the album yet found it difficult to describe saying "Every track is an adventure, and every adventure is full of more twists and turns than could ever be reasonably anticipated." Chattanooga Pulse described it as "a true joy of creation with expansive, genuinely stirring rock numbers."

References

Mike Watt
2019 debut albums